Simon Karlsson Adjei (born 10 November 1993) is a Swedish professional footballer of Ghanaian descent who plays for Allsvenskan club Varbergs BoIS as a striker.

Club career
His first childhood club was Waggeryds IK. He began his senior career playing for Husqvarna FF, Råslätts SK, and Tenhults IF. 

In 2016, he moved to Canada, joining Aurora United FC in League1 Ontario, where he scored 19 goals in 19 league games, as well as netting an additional two goals in the league cup. His coach at Aurora, Jim Brennan told him that "he’s too good for this league, and that he needs to go back to Europe."

He returned to Sweden and joined Assyriska IK in the third tier in 2018, where he scored 30 goals.

On 3 December 2018 Adjei signed a two-year contract with Canadian Premier League side York9, reuniting with his former manager at Aurora, Jim Brennan, and becoming the first foreign signing in league history. He made his debut for York9 in their inaugural match against Forge FC on April 27, 2019. He scored his first goal for the club in their following game on May 4, 2019 against Cavalry FC in a 2-1 defeat. In December, he re-signed with the club for the 2020 season. However, on 1 February 2020, Adjei agreed to the mutual termination of his contract. In 2020, he said that "It (Canadian soccer) is much tougher and you are left a little more on the field, you have to manage yourself a little more. You do not have the same support".

He then returned to his former club, Assyriska IK, in the Swedish third tier, where he scored 25 goals in 27 appearances.

In November 2020 Adjei joined top division club Varbergs BoIS.

References

External links
 
 Simon Karlsson Adjei club team profile at SvFF (in Swedish)

1993 births
Living people
Association football forwards
Swedish footballers
Swedish people of Ghanaian descent
Swedish expatriate footballers
Expatriate soccer players in Canada
Swedish expatriate sportspeople in Canada
Husqvarna FF players
York United FC players
Assyriska IK players
Varbergs BoIS players
Allsvenskan players
Ettan Fotboll players
League1 Ontario players
Canadian Premier League players
Aurora FC (Canada) players